Stefka Evstatieva (born 7 May 1947) is a Bulgarian operatic soprano. Born in Ruse, People's Republic of Bulgaria, she studied voice at the State Academy of Music in Sofia with Elena Kisselova (Елена Кисельова). She began her career with the Ruse Opera where she made her debut as Amelia in Un ballo in maschera and sang there from 1971 to 1979. In 1974 Stefka Evstatieva won the second prize at the International Tchaikovsky Competition in Moscow. (No first prize was awarded). In 1978 she won the Grand Prize of Belgian Radio & TV Belcanto Competition; in 1979 Grand Prize and Golden Ring in the Young Singers Competition in Sofia; and in 1982 the Best Performance Award at the Arena di Verona.

She joined the Sofia National Opera in 1978, and began to appear internationally two years later with debuts at the Vienna State Opera in 1980, the Munich State Opera and the Royal Opera in 1981 and the Arena di Verona and La Scala in 1983. Additional engagements included Paris, Rome, Brussels, Buenos Aires, Berlin, Canada and Frankfurt. Her debut in the United States was singing Lisa in The Queen of Spades with the Philadelphia Opera in 1983, then followed performances in San Francisco and Dallas in 1984 and 1986, with additional engagements in New Orleans, Miami and Baltimore. Her Metropolitan Opera debut was on April 9, 1984 singing Élisabeth de Valois in Don Carlos.

In addition to performing as a concert singer her major operatic roles included Aida, Donna Elvira, Desdemona, Leonora in Forza del Destino, Maddalena in Andrea Chénier, Élisabeth de Valois in Don Carlos, Amelia and the Russian roles of Lisa and Tatyana.

In 2004, Stefka Evstatieva helped establish the Bulgarian Children's Chorus and School Gergana, New York and has been a compensated advisor since 2009.

Sources
Henshenson, Roberta, "Tosca' Helps Reveal a Woman's Character", New York Times 15 October 1995
Metropolitan Opera, Performance record: Evstatieva, Stefka (Soprano) on the MetOpera Database
O'Connor, John, Review: "Tchaikovsky's Queen of Spades", New York Times, 9 April 1984
University of Pittsburgh, (University Center for International Studies), Stefka Evstatieva, soprano

External links

1947 births
Living people
20th-century Bulgarian women opera singers
People from Ruse, Bulgaria
Bulgarian sopranos